Farewell to the Duman River (두만강아 잘 있거라 Dumanganga jal itgeola) is a 1962 South Korean film. Directed by Im Kwon-taek in his directorial debut, it became a huge hit, establishing his reputation as a director and ensuring him a career in the film industry for the next decade.

Plot
Patriotic university student Youngwoo and his friends, led by their teacher Lee Sung, along with a British friend bid farewell to their families and become freedom fighters in Manchuria fighting against the Japanese occupation around the Tumen River.

References

Bibliography

External links

Films directed by Im Kwon-taek
1960s Korean-language films
South Korean action war films
1960s action war films